Devaughn  is an altered spelling of Irish surname Devine. Notable people with the surname include:

Raheem DeVaughn, American singer and songwriter
William DeVaughn, American R&B singer, songwriter  and guitarist
Will Devaughn, Filipino commercial model and actor

References

Surnames of Irish origin